Marÿke Hendrikse (born February 23, 1979) is a Bahamian–born Canadian voice actress who works primarily for Ocean Studios in Vancouver, British Columbia, Canada. She has played several roles in anime, most notably Revy in Black Lagoon and Lunamaria Hawke in Gundam Seed Destiny. She is also known for her roles as Susan Test in Johnny Test, Gilda in My Little Pony: Friendship Is Magic, Sonata Dusk in My Little Pony: Equestria Girls and Yasmin in the Bratz franchise.

History
Maryke was born in the Bahamas before she emigrated to Canada when she was 2 and a half years old, settling in Toronto. She was the first graduate from the alternative high school program Interact.

In 2008, she received the Elan Award for ‘Best Female Voice Over in an Animated Feature or TV Production’ for her role on Johnny Test.

She graduated from Douglas College in 2010 with a Child and Youth Care diploma, having a GPA of 4.15 out of a possible 4.33 that earned her a Governor General's Bronze Medal.

Roles
Anime
 Gintama° (TV) as Momochi Rappa
 Powerpuff Girls Z (TV) as Bubbles/Arturo (Weevil)
 Project ARMS as Kei Kuruma
 Black Lagoon as Revy
 Hikaru no Go (TV) as Mitani's Sister
 Inuyasha (TV) as Tsukiyomi (Episodes 139, 140)
 Mobile Suit Gundam Seed Destiny (TV) as Lunamaria Hawke
 Mobile Suit Gundam 00 as Wang Liu Mei
 Majokko Tsukune-chan (TV) as Tsukune
 MegaMan NT Warrior (TV) as Anetta
 Transformers: Cybertron (TV) as Thunderblast
 .hack//Roots (TV) as Tabby
 The Girl Who Leapt Through Time as Sekimi Nowake
 Zoids Wild as Battalia

Non-anime
 16 Hudson as Lola
 6teen as Hot Dog Vendor (1 episode)
 Beat Bugs as Milli Pede
 Blaster's Universe as G.C.
 Braceface as Genesis
 Bratz as Yasmin (season 2)
 Chip and Potato as Mrs. Whale
 Class of the Titans as Echo (episode 1.25: The Last Word)
 Dinosaur Train as Penelope the Protoceratops (1 episode)
 Dinotrux as Zera the Dozeratops (1 episode)
 Enchantimals as Bree Bunny, Twist Bunny
 Exchange Student Zero as Ms. Dunwall, Librarian
 George Shrinks as Helga
 Holly Hobbie & Friends as Amy, Carrie (Episode 5 & 6)
 Johnny Test as Susan Test, Jillian Vegan, Mrs. Crabapple, New Girl
 Johnny Test (2021 TV series) as Susan Test, Little Girl, Nurse, Scream, Local Roman, Staffer, Lucha Mom, Billy's Mom, Scream (2), Unicorn, Sad Pet Owner, Maid Marian, Boy Kid, Kid 1, Cosplay Girl, Gamer Kid, Mega Bon-Bon
 Journey to GloE as Meowskirs
 Kate & Mim-Mim as Kate and Boomer
 Lego Nexo Knights as Ava Prentis, Brickney Spears
 Lego Ninjago: Masters of Spinjitzu as Chamille
 Littlest Pet Shop: A World of Our Own as Bree Lahuahua, Owl 
 LoliRock as Debra
 Maryoku Yummy - Ooka
 Moville Mysteries as Marigold, Hannah Holston, Mirror, Betty Butterworth
 My Little Pony: Friendship Is Magic as Gilda (2 episodes, 2010 and 2015)
 My Secret Identity as Brooke (episode 2.23: More Than Meets the Eye)
 Mythic Warriors: Guardians of the Legend as 1st Village Girl (Phaeton: The Chariot of Fire)
 Pirate Express as Shelly & Shelli, Andromeda 
 Polly Pocket as Pamela Pocket, Paxton Pocket, Peaches Pocket, Melody, Ms. Mense, Lindsey, Referee
 Poochini's Yard as Brenda, Additional Voices
 Rescue Heroes as Princess (1 episode)
 Rev & Roll as Bo, Townsperson #1, Avery's Mom, Little Girl, Axle Anne
 Sabrina: Secrets of a Teenage Witch as Amy, Londa
 Slugterra as Dana Por
 StarBeam as Miserable Marla
 Superbook as Charlie, Ruth, Fortune Teller 
 Supernoobs as Amy Anderson, School Principal Warmerammer, Secretary Hedies, Ms. Blooth, Female Hiker, Cheerleader, Ms. Bowman, Blasteroid Representative, Old Lady, Tyler's Mom 
 Sushi Pack as Hideki
 Tara Duncan as Sandra Leylocke
 The Barefoot Bandits as Molly Moa (Canadian dub)
 The Berenstain Bears as Hillary
 The Little Prince as Kimi, Breeze (episodes 42-44 "La planète des Bamalias" arc)
 Totally Spies! as Stacy, Additional Voices
 Tutenstein as Tutankhsetamun (season 2)

Movies
 Barbie & her Sisters In A Puppy Chase (2016) as Spirit
 Barbie and the Diamond Castle (2008) as Melody
 Barbie: A Fashion Fairytale (2010) as Teresa, Incidental 1
 Barbie: A Perfect Christmas (2011) as Christie Clauson, Ivy Elif
 The Barbie Diaries (2006) as Reagen
 Barbie: Dolphin Magic (2017) as Marlo
 Barbie in A Mermaid Tale (2010) as Hadley
 Barbie in A Mermaid Tale 2 (2012) as Hadley
 Barbie: Mariposa and the Fairy Princess (2013) as Princess Catania
 Betsy Bubblegum's Journey Through Yummi-Land (2007) as Taffy Taryn
 Bob's Broken Sleigh (2015) as Muffin
 Bratz Babyz Save Christmas (2008) as Yasmin
 Bratz Babyz: The Movie (2006) as Yasmin
 Bratz: Desert Jewelz (2012) as Yasmin
 Bratz Fashion Pixiez (2007) as Yasmin
 Bratz Girlz Really Rock (2008) as Yasmin
 Bratz: Pampered Petz (2010) as Yasmin
 Bratz Super Babyz (2007) as Yasmin
 My Little Pony: A Very Pony Place (2007) as Brights Brightly
 My Little Pony Crystal Princess: The Runaway Rainbow (2006) as Brights Brightly, Breezie A
 My Little Pony: Equestria Girls – Rainbow Rocks (2014) and My Little Pony: Equestria Girls – Sunset's Backstage Pass (2019) as Sonata Dusk
 Sausage Party (2016) as Popped Cherry Mixer, Plum #1, Loretta Bun, Frozen Fruitz
 The Legend of Silk Boy as Tour Guide Tammy

Video games
 Dreamfall: The Longest Journey (2006) (as Maryke Hendrickse) as Lucia the Watilla/Sam Gilmore
 Bratz Girls Really Rock (2008) as Yasmin
 Dynasty Warriors: Gundam 2 (2009) as Lunamaria Hawke
 Dynasty Warriors: Gundam 3'' (2011) as Lunamaria Hawke
 Dragalia Lost (2018) as Sarisse

References

External links
 
 

1979 births
Living people
Actresses from Vancouver
Actresses from Toronto
Bahamian emigrants to Canada
20th-century Canadian actresses
21st-century Canadian actresses
Canadian film actresses
Canadian voice actresses
Canadian television actresses
Canadian video game actresses
Canadian sopranos